Francis James Walter Hobson (1889–1931) was an English footballer who played for Stoke.

Career
Hobson was born in Stoke-upon-Trent and played amateur football with Smallthorne before joining Stoke in 1910. He played in one first team match which came in a 4–0 win over Stafford Rangers during the 1910–11 season before returning to amateur football with Rocester.

Career statistics

References

English footballers
Stoke City F.C. players
1889 births
1961 deaths
Association football midfielders